The São João River is a tributary of the Canoas River in Santa Catarina state, southeastern Brazil. It is a tributary of the Inferno Grande River, part of the Uruguay River basin.

See also
List of rivers of Santa Catarina

References

Rivers of Santa Catarina (state)